is Garnet Crow's third single and was released on May 17, 2000. The song was used as a theme song for the Music Freak TV music channel and reached number 47 on the Oricon chart only for first week.

Track listing
All tracks are composed by Yuri Nakamura, written by Nana Azuki and arranged by Hirohito Furui.
Futari no Rocket (二人のロケット)
Mikanseina Neiro (未完成な音色)
Futari no Rocket(二人のロケット) ~cool smooth ver.~
Futari no Rocket (二人のロケット) (Instrumental)

References

External links
 GARNET CROW's official website
 GIZA studio's website

2000 singles
Garnet Crow songs
Giza Studio singles
2000 songs
Songs with lyrics by Nana Azuki
Song recordings produced by Daiko Nagato